Joakim Lund Ihlen (22 March 1899 – 15 September 1981) was a Norwegian industrialist. He was born in  Skedsmo, the son of engineer and politician Nils Claus Ihlen. He was co-manager of the workshop Strømmens Værksted for nearly fifty years, along with his brother Alf Ihlen.

He was married three times; his second wife was actress Lillemor von Hanno.

References

1899 births
1981 deaths
People from Skedsmo
20th-century Norwegian businesspeople
Norwegian expatriates in the United States